Kate Gilmore (born 1958) is an Australian human rights activist and Deputy High Commissioner for Human Rights of the United Nations.

Education
Gilmore studied at Stirling Theological College and it was initially claimed by OHCHR that she holds a Bachelor of Arts from the University of New England and postgraduate degrees in social work from the University of Melbourne and community development from RMIT. This biography was changed following discovery by UN whistle-blowers that Gilmore does not in fact hold postgraduate degrees. The UN has yet to publicly correct the press releases issued upon her appointment.

Career
Gilmore worked in a range of public sector and NGO positions. These include CEO of Broadmeadows Community Health Service (1992-1993) and manager of community care in the Royal Women's Hospital Australia (1993-1996) where she established  Australia's first Centre Against Sexual Assault and helped establish the Victorian Foundation for Survivors of Torture (Foundation House).  For Amnesty she was national director of Amnesty International Australia (1996-2000) and executive deputy secretary general of Amnesty International (2000-2010).

At the United Nations, Gilmore became assistant secretary-general and deputy executive director (programme) of the United Nations Population Fund in 2012 and in 2015 deputy high commissioner for human rights. In this role 
she is accountable to the high commissioner, currently Michelle Bachelet. Gilmore has been engaged in issues in Iraq on human rights violations and assisting the Iraq government. She serves as a co-chair, along with Princess Sarah Zeid of Jordan, of Every Woman Every Child EveryWhere

References

Australian officials of the United Nations
Amnesty International people
Living people
Place of birth missing (living people)
Australian public servants
1958 births
University of Melbourne alumni
University of New England (Australia) alumni
People educated at Mac.Robertson Girls' High School